The Chibitka (Çibit suu, literally: "Yellow river") is in the Altai Republic, Russia. It is a right tributary of the Chuya. It flows into the Chuya in the village Chibit.

In the Chibitka basin there are more than 20 lakes such as Lake Uzun-Kol and Cheybek-Kohl on the eastern slope of the Kurai Range. Thereafter, the right tributary flows into the Chibitka, which includes Lake Uzun-Kol in its upper reaches.

References

Rivers of the Altai Republic